Yellow 2G is a food coloring denoted by E number E107 with the colur index CI18965. It has the appearance of a yellow powder, and it is soluble in water. It is a synthetic yellow azo dye.

It is not listed by the UK's Food Standards Agency among EU approved food additives. Its use is also banned in Austria, Japan, Norway, Sweden, Switzerland and the United States.

References

External links

Food colorings
Azo dyes
Organic sodium salts
Pyrazoles
Benzenesulfonates
Chloroarenes
Acid dyes